Nathaniel Lincoln Mills (born February 15, 1970) is an American speed skater and skating coach. He was a three-time Olympian, competing at the Winter Games in 1992 Winter Olympics, 1994 Winter Olympics and, after a three-year retirement,  1998 Winter Olympics, when he was captain of the U.S. Olympic speedskating team. He also competed at the 1991 World Winter Universiade where he won a bronze in the 1,000 m; at the 1989 and 1991 World Championships, placing second in the 500 in 1991, and at two World Sprint Championships, in 1991 and 1998.

Mills transitioned into coaching following his competitive skating career. In the late 1990s, he helped coach the Canadian national team in Calgary. In 2002, Mills co-founded DC-ICE, a program that introduces youth in Washington, D.C. to skating sports. This program introduced Maame Biney, a member of the 2018 and 2022 U.S. Olympic short-track speedskating team, to the sport. Mills has worked with other Olympians including Shani Davis.

Mills' is the brother of Olympic gymnast Phoebe Mills and Junior World Figure Skating Champion Jessica Mills. He also trained as a lawyer  and actor.

References

External links
 

1970 births
Living people
American male speed skaters
Olympic speed skaters of the United States
Speed skaters at the 1992 Winter Olympics
Speed skaters at the 1994 Winter Olympics
Speed skaters at the 1998 Winter Olympics
Speed skaters from Chicago